Denisia luticiliella is a species of moth, belonging to the genus Denisia.

It is native to Eastern Europe.

References

Oecophoridae
Moths described in 1877